The 2015–16 Hong Kong First Division League is the 2nd season of Hong Kong First Division League since it became the second-tier football league in Hong Kong in 2014–15.

The league started on 6 September 2015 and ended on 15 May 2016.

Teams

Changes from last season

From First Division League
Promoted to Hong Kong Premier League
 KC Southern

Relegated to Second Division League
 Happy Valley
 Tuen Mun

To First Division League
Relegated from Premier League
 Tai Po

Promoted from Second Division League
 Easyknit Property

Team review
A total of 14 teams will contest the league, including 12 sides from the 2014–15, 1 team relegated from the Premier League and 1 side promoted from the Second Division.

Remarks:
1Due to financial difficulties, Metro Gallery Sun Source refused to promote to the Premier League.

League table

Results

References

Hong Kong First Division League seasons
Hong